State Road 23 (NM 23) was a state highway in the US state of New Mexico. NM 23's southern terminus was in Acoma Pueblo, and the northern terminus was at Interstate 40 (I-40). It was established in the mid-1930s and removed from highway system by the mid-1980s. It is now known as Indian Route 23.

References

Former state highways in New Mexico